Dmitro-Titovo is a rural locality (a selo) and the administrative center of Dmitro-Titovsky Selsoviet, Kytmanovsky District, Altai Krai, Russia. The population was 1,028 as of 2013. There are 13 streets.

Geography 
Dmitro-Titovo is located on the Chumysh River, 31 km northwest of Kytmanovo (the district's administrative centre) by road. Larionovo is the nearest rural locality.

References 

Rural localities in Kytmanovsky District